Qarsita    is a Sunni Muslim village located in the highest mountains of Miniyeh-Danniyeh District in North Lebanon.  The name of this village is derived from the two Arabic words "Qar" and "Sita" which mean famous ("sita") for cold ("Qar"). The village is famous for cultivation of pears, apples, peaches and variety of fruits and is one of the first producers of pears and apples in Lebanon. The very cold village, in comparison with surrounded areas, is characterized by its nature scenery and its unique position overlooking the city of Tripoli, the towns of Akkar district and the Syrian coast. Qarsita is one of the rich village in fresh water in Miniyeh-Danniyeh District, it contains thousandth of fresh water sources, the biggest one called Source of Sugar feeds a large number of villages in the area.

The village is located in the extreme north of Lebanon, bordered on the north by Sfira, by Beit El Faqs on the west, by Nemrin on the south and bordered on the east by Western Lebanese mountains chain. Qarsita is one of the biggest villages in area in Aldaniya district, however Qarn Jayroun area, which is 15 km far from Qarsita, belongs administratively to the municipality of Qarsita because its agricultural areas belong too to some Qarsitian families.

In 2012, Qarsita had an unofficial population of 5500, most of them are young. Since the 90th century, a large number of families migrated to the city of Tripoli either for work or to provide better educational opportunities.

Economy and culture
As already mentioned, Qarsita is one of the first producers of pears and apples in Lebanese villages. According to the Municipality of Qarsita, about 80% of the population live on agricultural benefits accompanied by conventional breeding of animals. Since 2000, beekeeping started to be an alternative product to agriculture due to weak exportation and the bad management from the successive governments. In Qarsita, some of industrial craft still steadfast. Recently, Qarsitian people started to go toward trading and the establishment of small businesses as alternative to agriculture and young educated people started to emigrate toward Arab States of the Persian Gulf, Europe and other. After all, 90% of the Qarsitian youth are well educated, among them several Ph.D. in medicine, physics, mathematics and others have been achieved.
Qarsita contains three official schools which are considered among the most important schools in Miniyeh-Danniyeh District in terms of education level.

References

External links
  Qarsaita, Localiban

Populated places in Miniyeh-Danniyeh District
Populated places in Lebanon
Sunni Muslim communities in Lebanon